As part of their 1972–73 tour of the Northern Hemisphere, the New Zealand national rugby union team's fourth match saw them take on Llanelli RFC of Wales at Stradey Park, Llanelli, on 31 October 1972. In one of the most famous results in rugby union history, Llanelli won the match 9–3 in front of 20,000 spectators. Llanelli centre Roy Bergiers scored the only try of the game, charging down a clearance by All Blacks scrum-half Lin Colling after a penalty from Phil Bennett rebounded back into play off the crossbar. New Zealand full-back Joe Karam scored a penalty to give them their only points of the game, before Llanelli wing Andy Hill hit a penalty to secure victory for the Scarlets. The result was immortalised by Welsh entertainer Max Boyce, whose poem 9–3 appears as the opening track on his Live at Treorchy album.

Background
As part of their 1972–73 tour of the Northern Hemisphere, the New Zealand national rugby union team played 32 matches, of which their visit to Stradey Park to play Llanelli RFC was the fourth. In North America, they had already beaten sides representing British Columbia (31–3) on 19 October 1972 and New York Metropolitan (41–9) on 21 October, followed by a 39–12 win over a Western Counties side in Gloucester on their arrival in England a week later. They were unbeaten since the British Lions had visited New Zealand in July 1971, a run of 16 matches without defeat.

Match details

Touch judges:
J Kelleher (Wales)
D G Watts (Wales)

References

Llanelli 1972
New Zealand 1972
1972–73 in Welsh rugby union
1972 in Wales
October 1972 sports events in the United Kingdom